Anthony Evans (born 11 January 1954) is an English former professional footballer.

Evans was born in Liverpool. He played as a forward for clubs including Cardiff City, for whom he made well over 100 appearances, and Birmingham City, for whom he was leading scorer in the 1981–82 season.

Evans scored a hat-trick for Birmingham City against Manchester City in September 1981. This was the last top-flight hat-trick for Birmingham City until Mikael Forssell scored three against Tottenham Hotspur in 2008.

He then spent 21 games of the 1983-84 season with Crystal Palace, scoring seven goals - all of them away from home - to ensure their safety in the Second Division.

He joined Swindon Town on a free transfer from Wolverhampton Wanderers in August 1985, staying for the whole season but only racking up 14 appearances - mostly in August and September, and none after January - before he went to Stafford Rangers in May 1986. He stayed there for one season.

On retiring from football, he became a social worker, setting up the "Midnight League" to give young people an opportunity to play organised football at night as a diversion from possibly less constructive activities.

References

1954 births
Living people
English footballers
Association football forwards
English Football League players
Blackpool F.C. players
Cardiff City F.C. players
Birmingham City F.C. players
Crystal Palace F.C. players
Wolverhampton Wanderers F.C. players
Bolton Wanderers F.C. players
Exeter City F.C. players
Swindon Town F.C. players
Stafford Rangers F.C. players
Footballers from Liverpool
Formby F.C. players